Armathwaite is a railway station on the Settle and Carlisle Line, which runs between  and  via . It is owned by Network Rail and managed by Northern Trains.

History

The station was opened by the Midland Railway on 1 May 1876. It was designed by company architect, John Holloway Sanders. The original station building, now a private house, is a medium-sized style station built from local red sandstone.

Following the closure of Cotehill, Cumwhinton and Scotby in the 1950s and 1960s, the station now serves as the final stop on the Settle & Carlisle line, prior to reaching the terminus at Carlisle.

The station was closed by British Rail on 5 May 1970, when local passenger trains ceased operating on the route. It was reopened on 14 July 1986. By then, the original station building on the Carlisle-bound platform had been sold for private use, so a passenger shelter was built at the northern end of the platform. A brick-built passenger waiting room exists on the Leeds-bound platform.

The station's signal box was built by the Midland Railway and placed in service on 16 July 1899. It was equipped with a 16-lever tumbler frame. The box was decommissioned on 15 January 1983. During 1992, it was restored by the Friends of the Settle to Carlisle Line. The refurbishment saw the signal box furnished with original Midland Railway block instruments and painted in original colours. It can be visited on Sundays by prior arrangement.

Stationmasters

W. Mee 1876 - 1878
J. Simpson 1878 - 1879 (afterwards station master at Luffenham)
Alfred Lee 1879 - 1885 (afterwards station master at Woodchester)
Thomas Moss 1885 - 1889 (formerly station master at Cotehill, afterwards station master at Appleby)
George Fletcher 1889 - 1904 
C. Taylor from 1904  
George Palmer ca. 1914 - 1921 (afterwards station master of Cresswell)
E.W. Edwards until 1939 (also station master at Cotehill, afterwards station master at Gyddelwern, Merioneth)
Stanley C. Routledge from 1939  (also station master at Cotehill)
F. Hulse from 1940 
L. Mortimer from 1941 (also station master at Cotehill)
Jack Alker 1945 - 1950  (afterwards station master at Blackrod)

Facilities

The station has two platforms, both of which have seating, waiting shelter (southbound only), next train audio and visual displays and an emergency help point. Platforms can be accessed from the car park (northbound) or nearby road (southbound), and do not have step-free access. There is a small car park at the station.

Services

As at May 2021, the station is served by eight trains per day (six on Sunday) towards Carlisle. Heading towards Leeds via Settle, there are seven trains per day (six on Sunday). All services are operated by Northern Trains.

Accidents and incidents
 Services between Armathwaite and Carlisle were suspended from 9 February 2016, due to a landslip north of the station at Eden Brows. The station served as the northern terminus of the Settle & Carlisle line until 30 March 2017, when the £23 million project to repair the embankment and reinstate the track bed was completed by Network Rail.

Notes

References

Sources

External links

Beeching closures in England
Former Midland Railway stations
DfT Category F2 stations
John Holloway Sanders railway stations
Railway stations in Cumbria
Railway stations in Great Britain opened in 1876
Railway stations in Great Britain closed in 1970
Railway stations in Great Britain opened in 1986
Northern franchise railway stations
Reopened railway stations in Great Britain